Joshua Chapel A.M.E. Church is a historic church at 110 N. Aiken St. Waxahachie, Texas.

It was built in 1917 and added to the National Register in 1986.

Photo gallery

See also

National Register of Historic Places listings in Ellis County, Texas
Recorded Texas Historic Landmarks in Ellis County

References

External links

African Methodist Episcopal churches in Texas
Gothic Revival church buildings in Texas
Churches completed in 1917
20th-century Methodist church buildings in the United States
Churches in Ellis County, Texas
Churches on the National Register of Historic Places in Texas
National Register of Historic Places in Ellis County, Texas
Recorded Texas Historic Landmarks